The 2012 AIBA Youth World Boxing Championships were held in Yerevan, Armenia, from November 25 to December 8, 2012. The competition is under the supervision of the world's governing body for amateur boxing AIBA and is the junior version of the World Amateur Boxing Championships. Boxers aged between 17 and 18 as of 1 January 2013 were eligible to compete.

Medal winners

Medal table

See also
 World Amateur Boxing Championships

References

Youth World Amateur Boxing Championships
Youth, 2012
2012 in Armenian sport
International sports competitions hosted by Armenia
Boxing in Armenia
Sports competitions in Yerevan
November 2012 sports events in Europe
December 2012 sports events in Europe
21st century in Yerevan